The Col. Young House is a historic house at 1007 SE Fifth Street in Bentonville, Arkansas. It is a two-story brick structure, with a cruciform plan and a hip roof that ends in a cornice studded with paired brackets. Unlike typical Italianate houses, this one lacks a porch highlighting its main entrance area. This house was built c. 1873, and is one Bentonville's first Italianate houses to be built.

The house was listed on the National Register of Historic Places in 1988.

See also
National Register of Historic Places listings in Benton County, Arkansas

References

Houses on the National Register of Historic Places in Arkansas
Italianate architecture in Arkansas
Houses completed in 1873
Houses in Bentonville, Arkansas
National Register of Historic Places in Bentonville, Arkansas
1873 establishments in Arkansas